Zoran Marojević (27 April 1942 – 24 April 2019) was a Serbian professional basketball player of Croat origin who competed for Yugoslavia in the 1968 Summer Olympics.

References

1942 births
2019 deaths
Serbs of Croatia
Serbian men's basketball players
Olympic basketball players of Yugoslavia
Basketball players at the 1968 Summer Olympics
Olympic silver medalists for Yugoslavia
Olympic medalists in basketball
OKK Beograd players
Medalists at the 1968 Summer Olympics
Mediterranean Games gold medalists for Yugoslavia
Competitors at the 1967 Mediterranean Games
Mediterranean Games medalists in basketball
Forwards (basketball)